Whatever Happened to P.J. Soles is the fifth studio album by the alternative rock band Local H. It was released on April 6, 2004 on Studio E Records. It received an Australian release doubled with Alive '05 on July 16, 2007.  "California Songs" and "Hey, Rita" have become staples at many of Local H's live performances.

The album title references P.J. Soles, an American actress, known for her roles in John Carpenter's 1978 horror film Halloween, the 1979 musical comedy Rock N Roll High School, and Ivan Reitman's 1981 comedy Stripes.

Track listing

Personnel
Scott Lucas – guitar, percussion, bass, vocals
Brian St. Clair – drums
Zak Schneider – mellotron on "Dick Jones"
Eric Oblander – harp on "Money on the Dresser"
Annie – photography
Kii Arens – photography, layout design, set design
Elizabeth Chesney – cover model
Matt Leatherman – assistant
Rodney Mills – mastering
Geoff Sabin – help

Appearances
The song "Everyone Alive" was featured in the video game Burnout 3: Takedown in 2004.

References

Local H albums
2004 albums